An upper house is one of two chambers of a bicameral legislature, the other chamber being the lower house. The house formally designated as the upper house is usually smaller and often has more restricted power than the lower house. A legislature composed of only one house (and which therefore has neither an upper house nor a lower house) is described as unicameral.

Definite specific characteristics
An upper house is usually different from the lower house in at least one of the following respects (though they vary among jurisdictions):

Powers:
In a parliamentary system, it often has much less power than the lower house. Therefore, in certain countries the upper house
votes on only limited legislative matters, such as constitutional amendments,
cannot initiate most kinds of legislation, especially those pertaining to supply/money, fiscal policy
cannot vote a motion of no confidence against the government (or such an act is much less common), while the lower house always can.
In a presidential system:
It may have equal or nearly equal power with the lower house.
It may have specific powers not granted to the lower house. For example:
It may give advice and consent to some executive decisions (e.g. appointments of cabinet ministers, judges or ambassadors).
It may have the sole power to try (but not necessarily initiate) impeachment cases against officials of the executive or even judicial branch, following enabling resolutions passed by the lower house.
It may have the sole power to ratify treaties.
In a semi-presidential system:
It may have less power than the lower house
in semi-presidential France, the Government can decide to legislate a normal law without the Sénat's agreement (Article 45 of the constitution), but
It may have equal power to the lower house regarding the constitution or the territorial collectivities. 
It may not vote a motion of no confidence against the government, but it may investigate State cases.
It may make proposals of laws to the lower house.

Status:
In some countries, its members are not popularly elected; membership may be indirect, ex officio or by appointment.
Its members may be elected with a different voting system than that used to elect the lower house (for example, upper houses in Australia and its states are usually elected by proportional representation, whereas lower houses are usually not).
Less populated states, provinces, or administrative divisions may be better represented in the upper house than in the lower house; representation is not always intended to be proportional to population.
Members' terms may be longer than in the lower house and may be for life.
Members may be elected in portions, for staggered terms, rather than all at one time.
In some countries, the upper house cannot be dissolved at all, or can be dissolved only in more limited circumstances than the lower house.
It typically has fewer members or seats than the lower house (though notably not in the United Kingdom parliament).
It has usually a higher age of candidacy than the lower house.

Powers

Parliamentary systems
In parliamentary systems the upper house is frequently seen as an advisory or a “house of review” chamber; for this reason, its powers of direct action are often reduced in some way. Some or all of the following restrictions are often placed on upper houses:

Lack of control over the executive branch. (On the other hand, in the US and many other presidential systems, the Senate or upper chamber has more control over the composition of the Cabinet and the administration generally, through its prerogative of confirming the president's nominations to senior offices.)
No absolute veto of proposed legislation, though suspensive vetoes are permitted in some states.
In countries where it can veto legislation (such as the Netherlands), it may not be able to amend the proposals.
A reduced or even absent role in initiating legislation.
No power to block supply, or budget measures (a rare example of a Parliamentary upper house that does possess this power is the Australian Senate, which notably exercised that power in 1975)

In parliamentary democracies and among European upper houses the Italian Senate is a notable exception to these general rules, in that it has the same powers as its lower counterpart: any law can be initiated in either house and must be approved in the same form by both houses. Additionally, a Government must have the consent of both to remain in office, a position which is known as "perfect bicameralism" or "equal bicameralism."

The role of a revising chamber is to scrutinise legislation that may have been drafted over-hastily in the lower house and to suggest amendments that the lower house may nevertheless reject if it wishes to. An example is the British House of Lords. Under the Parliament Acts 1911 and 1949, the House of Lords can no longer prevent the passage of most bills, but it must be given an opportunity to debate them and propose amendments, and can thereby delay the passage of a bill with which it disagrees. Bills can only be delayed for up to one year before the Commons can use the Parliament Act, although economic bills can only be delayed for one month. It is sometimes seen as having a special role of safeguarding the uncodified Constitution of the United Kingdom and important civil liberties against ill-considered change. The British House of Lords has a number of ways to block legislation and to reject it; however, the House of Commons can eventually use the Parliament Act to force something through. The Commons will often accept amendments passed by the Lords; however, the two houses have sometimes reached a constitutional standoff.  For example, when the Labour Government of 1999 tried to expel all hereditary peers from the Lords, the Lords threatened to wreck the Government's entire legislative agenda and to block every bill which was sent to the chamber. This standoff led to negotiations between Viscount Cranborne, the then Shadow Leader of the House, and the Labour Government, resulting in the Weatherill Amendment to the House of Lords Act 1999, which preserved 92 hereditary peers in the house. Compromise and negotiation between the two houses make the Parliament Act a very rarely used backup plan.

Even without a veto, an upper house may defeat legislation. Its opposition may give the lower chamber a chance to reconsider or even abandon a controversial measure. It can also delay a bill so that it does not fit within the legislative schedule, or until a general election produces a new lower house that no longer wishes to proceed with the bill.

Nevertheless, some states have long retained powerful upper houses. For example, the consent of the upper house to legislation may be necessary (though, as noted above, this seldom extends to budgetary measures). Constitutional arrangements of states with powerful upper houses usually include a means to resolve situations where the two houses are at odds with each other.

In recent times, Parliamentary systems have tended to weaken the powers of upper houses relative to their lower counterparts. Some upper houses have been fully abolished; others have had their powers reduced by constitutional or legislative amendments. Also, conventions often exist that the upper house ought not to obstruct the business of government for frivolous or merely partisan reasons. These conventions have tended to harden with a passage of time.

Presidential systems
In presidential systems, the upper house is frequently given other powers to compensate for its restrictions:

Executive appointments, to the cabinet and other offices, usually require its approval.
It frequently has the sole authority to give consent to ratify and abrogate foreign treaties.

Institutional structure
There are a variety of ways an upper house's members are assembled: by direct or indirect election, appointment or a mixture of these. The German Bundesrat is composed of members of the cabinets of the German states, in most cases the state premier and several ministers; they are delegated and can be recalled anytime. In a very similar way, the Council of the European Union is composed of national ministers.

Many upper houses are not directly elected but appointed: either by the head of state, by the head of government or in some other way. This is usually intended to produce a house of experts or otherwise distinguished citizens, who would not necessarily be returned in an election. For example, members of the Senate of Canada are appointed by the Governor General on the advice of the Prime Minister.

In the past, some upper houses had seats that were entirely hereditary, such as in the British House of Lords until 1999 and in the Japanese House of Peers until it was abolished in 1947.

It is also common that the upper house consists of delegates chosen by state governments or local officials. Members of the Rajya Sabha in India are nominated by various states and union territories, while 12 of them are nominated by the President of India. Similarly, at the state level, one-third of the members of the State Legislative Council (Vidhan Parishad) are nominated by local governments, one-third by sitting legislators, and the rest are elected by select members of the electorate. The United States Senate was chosen by the State legislatures until the passage of the Seventeenth Amendment in 1913.

The upper house may be directly elected but in different proportions to the lower house - for example, the senates of Australia, Brazil and the United States have a fixed number of elected members from each state, regardless of the population.

Abolition

Many jurisdictions once possessed upper houses but abolished them to adopt unicameral systems, including Croatia, Denmark, Estonia, Hungary, Iceland, Iran, Mauritania, New Zealand, Peru, Sweden, Turkey, Venezuela, many Indian states, Brazilian states, Canadian provinces, subnational entities such as Queensland, and some other jurisdictions. Newfoundland had a Legislative Council prior to joining Canada, as did Ontario when it was Upper Canada and Quebec from 1791 (as Lower Canada) to 1968.

Nebraska is the only state in the United States with a unicameral legislature, having abolished its lower house in 1934, while the Senate of Nebraska, the upper house prior to 1934, continues to assemble.

The Australian state of Queensland also once had an appointed Legislative Council before abolishing it in 1922.  All other Australian states continue to have bicameral systems (the two territories have always been unicameral).

Like Queensland, the German state of Bavaria had an appointed upper house, the Senate of Bavaria, from 1946 to 1999.

The Senate of the Philippines was abolished – and restored – twice: from 1935 to 1945 when a unicameral National Assembly convened, and from 1972 to 1987 when Congress was closed, and later a new constitution was approved instituting a unicameral Parliament. The Senate was re-instituted with the restoration of a bicameral Congress via a constitutional amendment in 1941, and via adoption of a new constitution in 1987.

A previous government of Ireland (the 31st Dáil) promised a national referendum on the abolition of its upper house, the Seanad Éireann, during the 24th Seanad session. By a narrow margin, the Irish public voted to retain it. Conservative-leaning Fine Gael and Left-leaning Sinn Féin both supported the abolition, while the centrist Fianna Fáil was alone among major parties in supporting the retention of the Seanad.

Titles of upper houses

Common terms
Senate — by far the most common
Legislative Council (Indian states having upper houses; Isle of Man; and every Australian state that has an upper house)
Federal Council (Germany, Austria) or Federation Council (Russia)
Council of States (Switzerland, India (Rajya Sabha), Sudan)
First Chamber — Netherlands (formerly, Sweden)
House of Lords – seen in the United Kingdom, as well as formerly in Ireland and in German-speaking monarchies (Herrenhaus), e.g. the Austrian House of Lords and the Prussian House of Lords

Unique titles

Notes and references

Further reading
 
 

Legislatures